Vaughn Jamel Booker (born February 24, 1968 in Cincinnati, Ohio) is a former American football defensive end who played nine years in the National Football League. Previously he played two seasons for the Winnipeg Blue Bombers in the Canadian Football League.

External links
NFL.com player page

1968 births
Living people
Players of Canadian football from Cincinnati
American football defensive ends
Cincinnati Bearcats football players
American players of Canadian football
Canadian football defensive linemen
Winnipeg Blue Bombers players
Kansas City Chiefs players
Green Bay Packers players
Cincinnati Bengals players
Players of American football from Cincinnati